The 1927–28 Plunket Shield season was a tournament of the Plunket Shield, the domestic first-class cricket competition of New Zealand.

Wellington won the championship, finishing at the top of the points table at the end of the round-robin tournament between the four first-class sides, Auckland, Canterbury, Otago and Wellington.

Table
Below are the Plunket Shield standings for the season:

References

Plunket Shield
Plunket Shield